Andries "Chaka Chaka" Mpondo (born 22 January 1963) is a retired South African football (soccer) striker who played for Moroka Swallows his whole career.

Early life
Mpondo played for Roman Rangers and Meadowlands Inter African Eleven as a teenager. He attended Daliwonga High School and Kelokitso High School with Doctor Khumalo and Marks Maponyane in Dube.

Moroka Swallows
He was signed for R20 000 after Fetsi Molatedi left for Chiefs for a record breaking R 45 000. He was the first player to score at the newly built FNB Stadium on 2 September 1989, beating new Kaizer Chiefs and former Manchester United goalkeeper Gary Bailey. By his retirement in 1996 he played 395 matches for Swallows.

References

1963 births
Living people
People from Meadowlands, Gauteng
Association football midfielders
South African soccer players
Moroka Swallows F.C. players
Sportspeople from Gauteng